This article lists all power stations in Gabon.

Hydroelectric

Thermal

Solar

See also 
 List of power stations in Africa
 List of largest power stations in the world

References

External links
 World Bank Estimates 90.7% of Gabon's Population Have Access To Electricity As of 2019.

Gabon
Power stations